Bristol station is a SEPTA Regional Rail station in Bristol, Pennsylvania. It is located at Beaver and Garden Streets, and serves the Trenton Line. It was built in 1911 by the Pennsylvania Railroad as a replacement for an earlier station on Pond and Market Streets. As with many Pennsylvania Railroad stations, the station became a Penn Central station once the New York Central & Pennsylvania Railroads merged in 1968. Amtrak took over intercity railroad service in 1971, but Penn Central continued to serve commuters between Philadelphia and Trenton. Conrail took over commuter service in 1976, and turned the Trenton Line over to SEPTA Regional Rail in 1983.

The station is in zone 4 on the SEPTA Trenton Line, on the Amtrak Northeast Corridor and at one time was an Amtrak station as well. In 2004, this station saw 277 boardings on an average weekday. Amtrak does not stop at this station.

Station layout

References

External links

 SEPTA – Bristol Station
 Flickr – Bristol Station
 Garden Street entrance from Google Maps Street View

SEPTA Regional Rail stations
Former Amtrak stations in Pennsylvania
Former Pennsylvania Railroad stations
Stations on the Northeast Corridor
Railway stations in Bucks County, Pennsylvania
Railway stations in the United States opened in 1911